三星, which means "three stars" in English, may refer to:
Samsung
Sanxing (disambiguation)

See also
Three star (disambiguation)